The individual eventing in equestrian at the Rio 2016 Summer Olympics was held at National Equestrian Center from 6 - 9 August.

Competition format

The team and individual eventing competitions used the same scores. Eventing consisted of a dressage test, a cross-country test, and a jumping test. The jumping test had two rounds. After the first jumping round, the teams results were determined. Both jumping rounds counted towards the individual results. Only the top 25 horse and rider pairs (including ties for 25th) after the first jumping round (adding the three components) competed in the second jumping round. However, each nation was limited to a maximum of three pairs qualifying for the second (final) jumping round.

Schedule

Times are Brasília time, BRT (UTC−03:00)

Results

Standings after Dressage

Standings after Cross Country

Standings after Jumping (Round 1)

Top 25 qualify for the final with a maximum of 3 riders per Nation (NOC).

Final Results after Jumping (Round 2)

References

Individual eventing